United States gubernatorial elections were held in 1924, in 36 states (including 1 special election), concurrent with the House, Senate elections and presidential election, on November 4, 1924 (October 7 in Arkansas, and September 8 in Maine).

This was the last time South Carolina elected its governors to two year terms, switching to four years from the 1926 election.

Results

See also 
1924 United States elections
1924 United States presidential election
1924 United States Senate elections
1924 United States House of Representatives elections

References

Notes 

 
November 1924 events